Patricia Hayes (1909–1998), was an English comedy actress.

Patricia Hayes may also refer to:

Patricia Hayes (historian)
Patty Hayes, female golfer

See also
Pat Hayes (disambiguation)